Mtaileb or Mtayleb  is a suburb north of Beirut in the Matn District of Mount Lebanon Governorate in Lebanon.

Mtaileb I
The site was discovered by Auguste Bergy in 1941 and a Heavy Neolithic assemblage of the Qaraoun culture consisting of enormous flint tools was collected and now held in the Museum of Lebanese Prehistory marked "1,500 m - 1,800m E.N.E. Antelias". The tools were studied by Jacques Cauvin and said to be made of impure Upper Jurassic flint. The area is now well built up with widely spaced villas and contains flint outcrops under the soil.

Mtaileb II
A small Neolithic assemblage of tools was collected in beige and grey flint with small axes and picks. One slightly polished trapezoidal axe was found. The material is stored in the Museum of Lebanese Prehistory marked "1500 m S.W. Mazraat-ech-Chaar".

References

External links
Mtayleb, Localiban

Populated places in the Matn District
Maronite Christian communities in Lebanon
Eastern Orthodox Christian communities in Lebanon

Archaeological sites in Lebanon
Heavy Neolithic sites
Neolithic settlements